The 1993 Five Nations Championship was the 64th series of the Five Nations Championship, an annual rugby union competition between the major Northern Hemisphere rugby union national teams. The tournament consisted of 10 matches held between 16 January and 20 March 1993.

The tournament was the 64th in its then format as the Five Nations. Including the competition's former incarnation as the Home Nations Championship, the 1993 Five Nations Championship was the 99th Northern Hemisphere rugby union championship. 

The championship was contested by England, France, Ireland, Scotland and Wales. France won the tournament, although a 16–15 opening defeat by England meant they failed to win the Grand Slam. The overall result was, however, France's tenth outright victory in the Five Nations, excluding seven titles shared with other countries.
Scotland, England and Ireland placed second, third and fourth respectively with two wins each, while Wales placed last with a one-point victory over England. England won the Calcutta Cup, while none of the Home Nations achieved the Triple Crown.

For the first time, a trophy was awarded to the winning team.

Participants

Squads

Table

Results

References

External links
 1993 Five Nations Championship at ESPN

Five Nations
Six Nations Championship seasons
Five Nations
Five Nations
Five Nations
Five Nations
Five Nations
  
Five Nations
Five Nations
Five Nations